Berge is a surname originating from the Province of Gaul. It is a topographical surname, for someone who lived up a steep bank.

Notable people with this name include
 Claude Berge, French mathematician
 Gunnar Berge, Norwegian politician
 Friedrich Berge (1811–1883), German naturalist and entomologist
 Irénée Berge (1867–1926), French composer
 Klaus Berge, German football player
 Niels van den Berge, Dutch politician
 Rinus van den Berge, Dutch athlete
 Svein Berge, Norwegian electronic musician
 Victor Berge (1891-1974), Swedish diver and author
 Sander Berge, Norwegian football player

References